The List of African words in Jamaican Patois notes down as many loan words in Jamaican Patois that can be traced back to specific African languages. Most of these African words have arrived in Jamaica through the enslaved Africans that were transported there in the era of the Atlantic slave trade.

References

Bibliography

Patois
Patois
African words in Jamaican Patois
Jamaican Patois
Jamaican Patois